George Emery Weller (August 24, 1857 – May 17, 1932) was a judge of the United States Customs Court and a member of the Board of General Appraisers.

Education and career

Born on August 24, 1857, in Saint Paul, Minnesota, Weller received a Bachelor of Laws in 1889 from Columbia Law School. He entered private practice from 1889 to 1918 in New York City, New York.

Federal Judicial Service

Weller was nominated by President Woodrow Wilson on December 3, 1918, to a seat on the Board of General Appraisers vacated by Samuel B. Cooper. He was confirmed by the United States Senate on January 3, 1919, and received his commission on January 6, 1919. Weller was reassigned by operation of law to the United States Customs Court on May 28, 1926, to a new Associate Justice seat (Judge seat from June 17, 1930) authorized by 44 Stat. 669. His service terminated on September 30, 1930, due to his retirement. He was succeeded by Judge David Hayes Kincheloe.

Death

Hayes died on May 17, 1932, in Atlantic City, New Jersey.

References

Sources
 

1857 births
1932 deaths
Judges of the United States Customs Court
People from Saint Paul, Minnesota
Columbia Law School alumni
Members of the Board of General Appraisers
United States Article I federal judges appointed by Woodrow Wilson
20th-century American judges